The 1981 Boston Red Sox season was the 81st season in the franchise's Major League Baseball history. Due to the 1981 Major League Baseball strike, play during the regular season was 
suspended for 50 days, and the season was split into two halves, with playoff teams determined by records from each half of the season. In the first half of the season, the Red Sox finished fifth in the American League East with a record of 30 wins and 26 losses, four games behind the New York Yankees. In the second half of the season, the Red Sox finished tied for second in the division with a record of 29 wins and 23 losses,  games behind the Milwaukee Brewers.  The Red Sox' overall record for the season was 59 wins and 49 losses.

Offseason 
 October 27, 1980: the Red Sox lured Ralph Houk out of retirement to become the 35th manager in Red Sox history.
 December 10, 1980: The Red Sox traded shortstop Rick Burleson and third baseman Butch Hobson to the California Angels in exchange for Carney Lansford, former Red Sox player Rick Miller, and Mark Clear. Burleson was unhappy with his contract negotiations with the Red Sox and hinted at leaving via free agency.
 January 23, 1981: Fred Lynn and Steve Renko were traded by the Red Sox to the California Angels for Joe Rudi, Jim Dorsey and Frank Tanana.

Regular season

Season standings

Record vs. opponents

Notable transactions 
 April 8, 1981: Dick Drago was traded by the Red Sox to the Seattle Mariners for Manny Sarmiento.
 June 8, 1981: Steve Lyons was drafted by the Red Sox in the 1st round (19th pick) of the 1981 Major League Baseball Draft.

Opening Day lineup 
 
Source:

The Chicago White Sox defeated the Red Sox on Opening Day, 5–3. It was the first game that Carlton Fisk played for the White Sox, after 11 seasons with the Red Sox; Fisk hit a three-run home run in the eighth inning.

Roster

Statistical leaders 

Source:

Batting 

Source:

Pitching 

Source:

Awards and honors 
 Mark Clear – AL Pitcher of the Month (May)
 Dwight Evans – Silver Slugger Award (OF), Gold Glove Award (OF), AL Player of the Month (May)
 Carney Lansford – Silver Slugger Award (3B)

All-Star Game
 Dwight Evans, reserve OF

Farm system 

LEAGUE CHAMPIONS: Bristol

Source:

References

External links 
1981 Boston Red Sox team page at Baseball Reference
1981 Boston Red Sox season at baseball-almanac.com

Boston Red Sox seasons
Boston Red Sox
Boston Red Sox
Red Sox